George Tisdale Hodges (July 4, 1789August 9, 1860) was an American politician who served as a U.S. Representative from Vermont. He was the first Republican member of the United States House of Representatives,although there was a similar Opposition Party.

Early life
Hodges was born in Clarendon in the Vermont Republic and attended the common schools.

Career
Involved in the banking industry in Rutland, Vermont, Hodges served as president of the Bank of Rutland for over twenty-five years.

Hodges served as a member of the Vermont House of Representatives from 1827 to 1829, 1839 and 1840. He served in the Vermont State Senate from 1845 to 1847 and was President pro tempore in 1846 and 1847.

A Whig Presidential Elector for Vermont in 1848, Hodges became a Republican when that party was founded. In 1856 he was elected to the Thirty-fourth Congress to fill the vacancy caused by the death of James Meacham. He served from December 1, 1856 to March 3, 1857. He was not a candidate for renomination in 1856.

Death
Hodges died on August 9, 1860 in Rutland. He is interred at Evergreen Cemetery in Rutland.

References

External links

 
 The Political Graveyard
 govtrack.us

1789 births
1860 deaths
People from Clarendon, Vermont
American bankers
Vermont Whigs
Members of the Vermont House of Representatives
Vermont state senators
Presidents pro tempore of the Vermont Senate
Republican Party members of the United States House of Representatives from Vermont
19th-century American politicians
19th-century American businesspeople
Burials at Evergreen Cemetery (Rutland, Vermont)